Canal Ocho (call sign LV 82 TV) is an television station in San Juan Province, Argentina. The station is owned and operated by Grupo América and carries programs from its América TV channel.

History 

LV 82 TV Channel 8 de San Juan made its first broadcast on May 2, 1964,

In the mid-1970s, more precisely during the presidency of Isabel Perón, Channel 8 was nationalized.

The official inauguration of the color broadcasts was on May 1, 1980.

 In 1994, the channel was sold to a company operated by the owners of channels 7 and 9 in Mendoza (who also operated the LV10 radio station in the capital of Mendoza).  Soon after, the company was divided, the owners of 7 stayed with Channel 8 and those of 9 took over LV10.

In September 1997, Grupo UNO (today Grupo América) acquired 3 over-the-air television channels (including Channel 8).

In March 1999, through Resolution 4098, the Ministry of Communications authorized Channel 8 to carry out tests on Digital Terrestrial Television under the ATSC regulations (regulations that were established by Resolution 2357 of 1998).  Channel 13 on the VHF band.

 On November 30, 2012, Grupo UNO submitted its voluntary adaptation plan to the Federal Authority for Audiovisual Communication Services in order to adapt to the Law on Audiovisual Communication Services, where it proposed, among others, to sell Channel 8, Channel 7 of Mendoza, 6 radios, 8 cable TV licenses and 3 signal registrations The plan was approved on February 17, 2014, leaving the 16 licenses and 3 signal registrations for sale.  December 2015, through Decree 267/2015 (published on January 4, 2016), changes were made to several articles of the law.  The changes in the law meant that it was no longer necessary for Grupo UNO to adapt to the Law.  On February 2, the National Communications Entity (successor to AFSCA) decided to archive all adaptation plans (including that of Grupo UNO);  As a consequence of this, Grupo UNO is no longer obliged to sell any of its licenses.

On March 31, 2015, the Federal Authority for Audiovisual Communication Services, through Resolution 236, assigned Channel 8 Channel 20.1 to broadcast regularly (in HD format) on Digital Terrestrial Television.

At the beginning of 2018, the agreement between Artear and Grupo América ended, since both did not renew the Contract for the Distribution of content of said channel for Cuyo, so it began to transmit only programs from America.  On January 20 of the same year, Eltrece's programming returned to Channel 8. That period ended again at the end of August and, coincidentally, before the start of the new Showmatch season, because the channel's Management stated that it will reinforce the local programming.  In addition, they confirmed that they will broadcast part of the América TV grid.

On December 9, 2019, Channel 8 began broadcasting its programming in HD.

Notes

External links 
 

Television stations in Argentina
Television channels and stations established in 1964
Grupo América